Morelock is the surname of:

 Eunice Hutto Morelock (1904–1947), a pioneer professor at Bob Jones College and possibly the first female chief academic officer of a coeducational college in the United States
 Harry Morelock (1869–1949), American Major League Baseball player
 Sterling L. Morelock (1890–1964), United States Army private and recipient of the Medal of Honor